Hend is an Arabic given name and an occasional surname. It may refer to the following notable people:
Given name
Hend Al-Mansour (born 1956), Saudi Arabian-American artist
Hend bint Faisal Al-Qasimi (born 1984), Emirati princess 
Hend Kheera (born 1981), Egyptian street artist
Hend Sabry (born 1979), Tunisian actress
Hend Zaza (born 2009), Syrian table tennis player

Surname
Scott Hend (born 1973), Australian golfer